Anastasios "Taso" Vasiliadis (born 16 February 1974) is a retired professional Greek tennis player. As a junior player, he represented Australia at the 1990 Junior Davis Cup and reached the quarterfinals at the Australian Open in 1992, where he lost to future world No. 42 and then countryman Scott Draper 10–8 in the third and deciding set.

He switched allegiances later on, and as a professional he represented Greece at the Davis Cup and at the Mediterranean Games. A doubles specialist, he prevailed in four out of five matches in Davis Cup, and won a bronze medal at the 2001 Mediterranean Games, always partnering with Konstantinos Economidis.

External links
 
 
 

1974 births
Living people
Greek male tennis players
Mediterranean Games gold medalists for Greece
Competitors at the 2001 Mediterranean Games
Mediterranean Games medalists in tennis